Jana Malik (born 26 April 1974) is a Pakistani actress who appears in television serials. Jana Malik is also known as Janan or Jana. She is best known for playing the supporting character of Pashi snake-charmer in supernatural series Naagin, which aired on Geo Kahani. She was seen in the television serials Mar Jain Bhi To Kya , Parlour Wali Larki and Ek Tamanna Lahasil Si and is well known for her lead role in the serial Aiteraaf. In addition, she has also been seen in Muhafiz, Zor in 1998.

Personal life 
She was born in Lahore on 26 April 1974.

She was married to Nouman Javaid on 2 September 2016. The couple divorced in March 2017.

Career 
Jana started her career as an actress in PTV when she was thirteen years old. She made her debut with the serial Reizgar aired on PTV Home. After that she was seen in Maigh Malhaar and then acted in a children's musical show Aangan Aangan Tarey on PTV. She also appeared in an Urdu language film Muhafiz in 1998 with Nadeem and Saud. Presently, she is being seen on different TV channels and in television serials. She played lead role in Aiteraaf in 2011 on ARY Digital. The next serials in which she starred in includes, Kis Din Mera Viyah Howay Ga, Ek Tamanna Lahasil Si, Mor Mahal and Marzi. From 2017 to 2019, she starred in Geo Kahani's hit series Naagin.

Filmography 

 Muhafiz – 1998
 Zor – 1998

Television 
 Landa Bazar
 Reizgar
 Kanch k Parr
 Maigh Malhaar
 Aangan Aangan Tarey
 Unbayanable
 Moum
 Ibn-e-Adam
 Aiteraaf
 Kis Din Mera Viyah Howay Ga
 Bulandi
 Jo Chale To Jaan Se Guzar Gaye
 Qissa Chaar Darvesh
 Mere Huzoor
 Jahez
 Topi Drama
 Mar Jain Bhi To Kya
 Ek Tamanna Lahasil Si as Hira
 Adhura Milan
 Dil Se Dil Tak 
 Kaanch Kay Par 
 Mor Mahal as Shaista 
 Parlour Wali Larki as Shehnaz
Naagin as Pashi (2017–2019)

Baking career 
In 2019, Malik started her online bakery named "BakeSpy". After that, Jana completed a diploma in professional patisserie from SCAFA, a cooking school in Lahore.

References

External links 
 Jana Malik at the TV.com.pk
Jana Malik at the WikiBioMint.com

Living people
Pakistani television actresses
Pakistani film actresses
Actresses from Lahore
20th-century Pakistani actresses
21st-century Pakistani actresses
Pakistani people of Kashmiri descent
Actresses in Urdu cinema
1974 births
People from Lahore